Shrikant Lele (born 1943) is an Indian metallurgical engineer and a distinguished professor of Indian Institute of Technology (BHU) Varanasi. He is a former director of the Institute of Technology of the university (2002–05) and is known for his studies on structural metallurgy. He is credited with reportedly original work on X-ray diffraction effects, solid state and martensitic transformations as well as spinodal decomposition in alloys and electron diffraction from quasicrystals. His researches have been documented in several peer-reviewed articles; and Google Scholar the online article repository of Indian Academy of Sciences has listed 33 of them.

Born on 24 January 1943, Shrikant Lele is the author of a book, Thermodynamics of Materials (Cambridge Solid State Science Series) and has also contributed chapters to books published by others. He is associated with the INSPIRE program of the Department of Science and Technology as a member of its Engineering section and is an elected fellow of the Indian Academy of Sciences, and the National Academy of Sciences, India. The Council of Scientific and Industrial Research, the apex agency of the Government of India for scientific research, awarded him the Shanti Swarup Bhatnagar Prize for Science and Technology, one of the highest Indian science awards for his contributions to Engineering Sciences in 1987. He received the Professor Brahm Prakash Memorial Medal of the Indian National Science Academy in 2010. The Defence Metallurgical Research Laboratory organized a conference on Advanced X-Ray Techniques in Research and Industry in honour of Lele on the occasion of his 60th birth anniversary.

Selected bibliography

Books

Chapters

Selected articles

Notes

References

External links 
 
 

Recipients of the Shanti Swarup Bhatnagar Award in Engineering Science
1943 births
Indian scientific authors
Fellows of the Indian Academy of Sciences
Fellows of The National Academy of Sciences, India
Banaras Hindu University alumni
Academic staff of Banaras Hindu University
Engineers from Uttar Pradesh
Indian metallurgists
Living people